The 1933 French Grand Prix was a Grand Prix motor race which was run on 11 June 1933, in Montlhéry, France. Organized by the French Automobile Club, it was XXVII running of the Grand Prix de l'Automobile Club de France. The race, which was held over 40 laps, was won by the Italian driver Giuseppe Campari in a privately entered Maserati. It was to be Campari's final victory, as he was killed just three months later at Monza. Philippe Étancelin and George Eyston, both in privateer Alfa Romeos, finished in second and third, respectively.

Background
In an attempt to attract more entrants, the Automobile Club de France (ACF) changed the event's registration fees and prize money. Registration fees had previously been 2,000–3,000 francs (F), but were reduced to just 100 F for the 1933 race. Prizes of 100,000 F, 50,000 F and 20,000 F were offered to the first three finishers, while there were also bonus prizes for drivers who had completed 10, 20 or 30 laps. The magnitude of the bonuses were dependent on a driver's average speed (3,000 F for 125 km/h, 2,000 F for 115 km/h, 1,000 F for 105 km/h).

Problems with the grandstand at Montlhéry placed the event's staging in jeopardy. Repairs, estimated at 500,000–800,000 F, needed to be carried out before the race could take place.

The race was also affected by the absence of a number of notable drivers. Frédéric Toselli, Louis Trintignant (brother of the future Formula One driver Maurice), and Guy Bouriat, all of whom had entered the French Grand Prix, had all been killed at previous events in May. In addition, Rudolf Caracciola was still recovering his broken thigh, an injury which had been incurred at Monaco, while Tim Birkin was ill with blood poisoning after being burnt at Tripoli. On top of that, the works Bugatti team—including drivers Achille Varzi, Albert Divo, William Grover-Williams and René Dreyfus—were forced to pull out of the event because their cars were not ready.

Report
Tazio Nuvolari's participation in the race was in doubt when his car was damaged during Saturday practice. It is thought that his Scuderia Ferrari teammate, Baconin Borzacchini, allowed Nuvolari to swap the cars that were assigned to them, meaning that Nuvolari took the #10 Alfa, while Borzacchini was now due to drive car #14 (which had a broken blower shaft). Just ten minutes before the start of the race, the team's mechanics pushed Borzacchini's car (#14) off the grid, putting Piero Taruffi's #38 Alfa in its place. As such, Taruffi was able to start three rows further forward than he otherwise would have.

Nuvolari, from fifth on the grid, took the lead early on, while Campari followed eight seconds behind, after having made up nine positions on lap one. Taruffi and Zehender from the third row of the grid, were in third and fourth, respectively, followed by Chiron and Étancelin, who had both made significant gains in the early stages. Chiron and Étancelin both overtook the Maserati of Zehender during lap two, and two laps later, the pair also passed Taruffi, who had been deliberately holding them up. After four laps, Nuvolari and Campari were still in front, while Chiron was up to third, ahead of Philippe Étancelin, while Taruffi and Zehender were not far behind. Both Nuvolari and Chiron pitted after six laps, although neither lasted long after rejoining the race, leaving Campari in first place, with a lead of over half a minute over Taruffi and Étancelin after eight laps. Campari made a pitstop after thirteen laps, handing the lead briefly to Étancelin, before the Frenchman was overtaken by Taruffi. After sixteen laps, Campari was approximately half a minute behind, but by the end of the nineteenth lap he had retaken the lead. At half distance, Campari led from Taruffi, with Sommer and Étancelin in third and fourth, respectively. Soon after, Taruffi pulled into the pits, and his car eventually rejoined the race, now driven by Nuvolari, who after twenty-four laps was in fourth place, behind Campari, Étancelin and Moll. Nuvolari was promoted into third when Moll made a lengthy pitstop, while Eyston was up to fourth. On lap twenty-six, Nuvolari was once again forced to retire, leaving just six cars in the race. Another pitstop for Campari allowed Étancelin to take a half-minute lead, although, by lap thirty-six, the gap had been reduced to just three seconds. However, when rain began to fall, Campari took to the pits once again to change tyres, increasing his deficit to Étancelin to a full minute. With one lap remaining, the gap had been reduced to 23.2 seconds. With Étancelin unable to change gears, Campari was able to take the lead, and shortly after, the win, which was his final victory, and Maserati's first in a Grande Épreuve. Étancelin took second, ahead of Eyston in his Alfa Romeo. Sommer, Moll and Villars were final cars to finish.

Entries

Starting grid

Classification

Race

Notes:
 Campari's Maserati was push-started during a pit stop, which was technically a breach of Article 187 of the regulations. As such, Campari's win was protested after the race, but the Sporting Commissioners upheld the result, penalising him only with a 1000 F fine.

References

External links

French Grand Prix
French Grand Prix
Grand Prix